Elenin may refer to:
Leonid Elenin, a Russian amateur astronomer 
C/2010 X1, a long-period comet discovered by Leonid Elenin
Elenin Vrah, a mountain in Rila Municipality of Bulgaria
Platon Elenin, an alias of Russian businessman Boris Berezovsky

See also
Eleni (disambiguation)
Lenin (disambiguation)